Kevin Hilton is an American former ice hockey center who was an All-American for Michigan

Career
Hilton joined the ice hockey program at Michigan right out of high school, joining a team that was in the middle of a run as one of the top teams in the nation. Hilton played well enough as a freshman to be selected by the Detroit Red Wings in the 3rd round of the 1993 NHL Draft. He provided depth scoring as an underclassmen but began to come into his own as a junior. Hilton more than doubled his point production in 1995 and played on his second US junior team.

As a senior, Hilton's goal production halved but his assist total swelled and he finished with the third highest total in the nation. The production earned him a spot on the All-American team and helped Michigan win their conference championship. The Wolverines made their 6th consecutive NCAA Tournament appearance and reached the championship game for the first time in 19 years. Hilton was held off the scoresheet in the final game but the Wolverines still managed to win the match in overtime, giving the program its 8th national championship overall and the first since 1964.

After graduating, Hilton began his professional career. He bounced around a bit in his first few seasons and ended up playing for the Mississippi Sea Wolves in 1999. He was one of the top scorers for the team during the Kelly Cup playoffs, helping the team win the championship. The next season he found himself playing for the Charlotte Checkers and remained with the club for most of the next three seasons. After two highly productive years and just a 1-game appearance at the AHL level, Hilton ended his playing career in 2002.

With his playing days over, Hilton began his second career in sales working for several company of the next two decades. He progressed up the ranks, eventually becoming a national sales and marketing manager with KHPP Windows and Doors in 2021.

Statistics

Regular season and playoffs

Awards and honors

References

External links

1975 births
Living people
Ice hockey people from Michigan
People from Trenton, Michigan
American men's ice hockey centers
Michigan Wolverines men's ice hockey players
AHCA Division I men's ice hockey All-Americans
NCAA men's ice hockey national champions
Detroit Red Wings draft picks
Mississippi Sea Wolves players
Quebec Rafales players
Worcester IceCats players
Mobile Mysticks players
Orlando Solar Bears (IHL) players
Alexandria Warthogs players
Springfield Falcons players
Charlotte Checkers (1993–2010) players
Hartford Wolf Pack players